The ARIA Music Award for Best Pop Release, is an award presented at the annual ARIA Music Awards, which recognises "the many achievements of Aussie artists across all music genres", since 1987. It is handed out by the Australian Recording Industry Association (ARIA), an organisation whose aim is "to advance the interests of the Australian record industry." To be eligible, "the recording must be directed at contemporary hit radio or Top 40 formats." The accolade is voted for by a judging academy, which comprises 1000 members from different areas of the music industry, and is given to an artist who is either from Australia or an Australian resident.

The award for Best Pop Release was first presented to Peter Andre in 1994, for his album of the same name. Kylie Minogue has received four wins from ten nominations, more than any other artist, for "Where the Wild Roses Grow" (with Nick Cave and the Bad Seeds) in 1996, "Spinning Around" in 2000, Light Years in 2001 and Fever in 2002.

Winners and nominees
In the following table, the winner is highlighted in a separate colour, and in boldface; the nominees are those that are not highlighted or in boldface.

References

External links
 The ARIA Awards Official website

P
Pop music awards